Kajiya (usually written 加治屋) is a Japanese surname. Notable people with the surname include:

Jim Kajiya, American computer scientist
Yoshito Kajiya (born 1938), Japanese politician
Yuriko Kajiya (born 1984), Japanese ballet dancer

Japanese-language surnames